Worcester is an unincorporated community in Audrain County, in the U.S. state of Missouri.

History
A post office called Worcester was established in 1877, and remained in operation until 1907. The community was named after Worcester, Massachusetts, the native home of a share of the first settlers.

References

Unincorporated communities in Audrain County, Missouri
Unincorporated communities in Missouri